Piet Hoekstra (born 24 March 1947) is a Dutch former cyclist. He competed in the team pursuit at the 1968 Summer Olympics.

See also
 List of Dutch Olympic cyclists

References

External links
 

1947 births
Living people
Dutch male cyclists
Olympic cyclists of the Netherlands
Cyclists at the 1968 Summer Olympics
Sportspeople from Leeuwarden
Cyclists from Friesland
20th-century Dutch people